Unbreakable is a 2008 reality television series presented by explorer Benedict Allen on UK's Channel 5, where eight volunteers undergo an onslaught of physical and mental pressure in a bid to be declared unbreakable.

Filmed across four continents, Unbreakables takes eight super-fit members of the public on a punishing global trail to undergo a series of brutal challenges.

In settings ranging from the Norwegian arctic to the Sahara Desert, the volunteers learned to survive in the world's harshest environments and endured difficult military training. They were bossed and cajoled by physical trainers and survival experts as they bid to outdo and outlast each other.

Contestants

Episodes

Episode 1
The jungle of Guyana. They're spurred on by Mark Billingham, a jungle warfare instructor who served with the British SAS for 27 years. They also face challenges inspired by a tribe of former cannibals.

Episode 2
Norwegian School of Winter Warfare in Norway. They are placed in the vicinity of a TNT explosion and forced to jump into an ice hole while still wearing their skis. During the nights they were required to dig a snow holes and sleep in them.

Episode 3
The Royal Navy. After a week's training in Portsmouth, they go aboard HMS Belfast on nearby Whale Island and face simulations of both a sinking under heavy gunfire and a terrifying helicopter crash. After disorientation and freezing temperatures, their final challenge is a two assault course challenge including the disassembling of a 1,250lb gun.

Episode 4
Sahara Desert. They find themselves at the mercy of The French Foreign Legion. Taking them into the Sahara, they subject them to a series of gruelling challenges, including being buried alive, a 10-kilometre camel race, and an exhausting run over the sand dunes while wearing stifling gas masks.

Episode 5
US Navy SEALs. They travel to Virginia to carry out "simulated" Navy SEAL training with some former US Navy SEALs, whose beach-based challenges from long beach runs to "surf torture" leave them physically and emotionally drained. After the first day, Carla suffers from dehydration and exhaustion, but must face her fear of water in a drownproofing challenge where the volunteers repeatedly sink in a pool with their ankles and wrists bound.

Episode 6
Everglades. They will be sharing the territory with two million alligators and 60 species of venomous snake, and perhaps most formidable of all, their Native American guide. “My name is not important to you,” he sneers. “But you will call me Teacher.” They have to cut open an alligator and remove its entrails with their bare hands. They canoe across alligator infested waters and wrestle alligators, and play a game of lacrosse.

Episode 7
South Africa. They are required to take on the might of highly trained Zulu warriors in a series of stick-fighting contests. However, before they are deemed worthy of battle, the contenders must first prove themselves by stealing honey from wild bees, and participate in a body cleansing ritual.

Episode 8
The unbreakables are handed over to The South African Elite Fighting Force, ex-special forces instructors who teach African armies the reality of warfare. The unbreakables are woken before dawn to find that Barnaby has vanished, but the unbreakables along with the South African elite forces find him, and he is told that he is broken.

After David Bain has proven himself the strongest boxer among those remaining, he breaks while being buried alive, blaming it on his claustrophobia.

Against all odds, the 3 remaining, Frasier, Angus and Matt manage to reach the finish and are considered 'Unbreakable'.

Episode 8 was not available on Channel 5's Player due to copyright and contractual reasons.

External links
Series Director Leo McCrea's site
Fi Ramsden's site. The doc.
Facebook page for David Bain
Facebook group for Unbreakable

2000s British reality television series
2008 British television series debuts
2008 British television series endings
Channel 5 (British TV channel) original programming
Television series by Warner Bros. Television Studios